Musgravea heterophylla, commonly known as the briar oak, is a species of rainforest tree of the family Proteaceae from north-eastern Queensland. It was described in 1969 by Lindsay Stewart Smith, having been collected near Kuranda.

References

Proteaceae
Endemic flora of Queensland
Proteales of Australia